The Nicaraguan Football Champion is the winner of the Nicaragua National Football Championship 
Currently, there are two champions each calendar year with one champion for the Apertura season and one for the Clausura season.

List of champions year by year

Champions
Teams in bold are currently participating in Primera Division de Nicaragua.
 (#) – Current Primera Division Champion
 (†) – Defunct national team

See also 
Nicaraguan Primera División

External links

Nicaraguan Primera División